Gharbi (also called Kakrak) is a village of Orūzgān Province, Afghanistan.

See also
 Orūzgān Province

References 

Populated places in Urozgan Province
Villages in Afghanistan